Robert McAllister may refer to:

Robert McAllister (politician) (1876–1963), businessman and politician in New Brunswick, Canada
Bob McAllister (athlete) (1899–1962), American sprinter.
Bobby McAllister (born 1963), American soccer player
Bob McAllister (1934–1998), American television personality

See also
Robbie McAllister, Scottish professional wrestler
Bobby McAllister (gridiron football) (born 1966), American football and Canadian football quarterback
Robert McCallister (disambiguation)